Drs. Ferdinandus Johannes Maria Crone (born 19 July 1954) is a Dutch politician. He was born in Dordrecht in 1954. On 15 November 2007 he became mayor of Leeuwarden. He remained mayor until the 26th of August 2019 when he was replaced by Sybrand Buma. As of February 2020 he is a member of the First Chamber of the States General.

He was made a knight of the Order of Orange Nassau on 15 November 2007.

References 

1954 births
Living people
Mayors of Leeuwarden
Knights of the Order of Orange-Nassau
Members of the Senate (Netherlands)
People from Dordrecht
21st-century Dutch politicians